TFM (3-trifluoromethyl-4-nitrophenol) is a common piscicide, i.e., a fish poison used to combat parasitic and invasive species of fish.

The substance was discovered in 1958 when researching means to combat sea lampreys and it  remains the primary lampricide (lamprey-killer) in the Great Lakes area.

TFM toxicity has not been thoroughly investigated for humans, but is considered an irritant, respiratory irritant, and toxic by the manufacturer. Toxicity studies of other mammals have generally found it to be non-toxic at concentrations expected to be found in treated areas. Impact on other fish species may be controlled by selective application during the larvae season for lampreys and other management of its concentration. TFM does not accumulate, since it breaks down within several days.

References

Pesticides
Agnatha
Fisheries science
Nitrophenols
Trifluoromethyl compounds